Manannah is an unincorporated community in Manannah Township, Meeker County, Minnesota, United States.  The community is located near the junction of Meeker County Roads 3 and 30.  Nearby places include Eden Valley, Grove City, Paynesville, and Litchfield.  State Highways 4 (MN 4) and 22 (MN 22) are also in the immediate area.

History

Manannah was platted in 1856, and again in 1871, and supposedly named after a place in Scotland. A post office was established at Manannah in 1857, and remained in operation until 1907.

References

Former municipalities in Minnesota
Unincorporated communities in Minnesota
Unincorporated communities in Meeker County, Minnesota
1856 establishments in Minnesota Territory
Populated places established in 1856